Live at Bestival 2012 is a live album by New Order, recorded in September 2012 at Bestival 2012, which was held at Robin Hill, Isle of Wight, England. It was released via Sunday Best on 8 July 2013.

All the profits raised from the album will be donated to Isle of Wight Youth Truth, which offers support services for young people on the Isle of Wight. The track listing features mostly a selection of greatest hits, such as "Bizarre Love Triangle" and "True Faith". It also includes three Joy Division songs: "Isolation", "Transmission" and "Love Will Tear Us Apart".

Like the previous live release, Live at the London Troxy, this album features Tom Chapman replacing former member Peter Hook on bass guitar.

Track listing
All songs written by Bernard Sumner, Stephen Morris, Peter Hook and Gillian Gilbert, except where noted.

Charts

References

External links
 Semi-official website
 Live at Bestival 2012 at Sunday Best

2013 live albums
New Order (band) live albums
Charity albums